An internal conflict is the struggle occurring within a character's mind. Things such as what the character yearns for, but can't quite reach. As opposed to external conflict, in which a character is grappling some force outside of themself, such as wars or a chain-breaking off a bike, or not being able to get past a roadblock. The dilemma posed by internal conflict is usually some ethical or emotional question. Indicators of internal conflict would be a character's hesitation or self-posing questions like "what was it I did wrong?". An internal conflict can also be a decision-making issue.

The term "internal conflict" is also widely used to describe a military conflict within a nation, such as a civil war. An internal conflict is a domestic conflict, and can be caused because of political, economic or religious causes.

See also 
 Conflict (narrative) 
 Cognitive dissonance

References

Chopin, K., & Correll, G. (2011). The story of an hour and other stories. Good Ink.
Hecker, L. (1993). The stolen party and anthology of women's stories. Cambridge Univ. Press.
"Internal Conflict Examples In Literature". Examples.Yourdictionary.Com, 2021, 	https://examples.yourdictionary.com/internal-conflict-examples.html.
Lessing, D. (2013). Through the tunnel.

Conflict (narrative)